Frank Smith (1928-2020) was a Canadian psycholinguist recognized for his contributions in linguistics and cognitive psychology. He was an essential contributor to research on the nature of the reading process together with researchers such as George Armitage Miller, Kenneth S. Goodman, Paul A. Kolers, Jane W. Torrey, Jane Mackworth, Richard Venezky, Robert Calfee, and Julian Hochberg. Smith and Goodman are founders of whole language approach for reading instruction. He was the author of numerous books.

Life, career and education

Frank Smith was born in England in 1928 and lived on Vancouver Island, British Columbia, Canada. He started out as reporter and editor for several media publications in Europe and Australia before commencing undergraduate studies at the University of Western Australia. He received a PhD in Psycholinguistics from Harvard University in 1967.

Smith held positions as professor at the Ontario Institute for Studies in Education for twelve years, professor of Language in Education at the University of Victoria, British Columbia as well as professor and department-head of Applied English Language Studies at the University of the Witwatersrand, South Africa. Before taking the position at the Ontario Institute, Smith briefly worked at the Southwest Regional Laboratory in Los Alamitos, California.

He died on December 29, 2020, in Victoria, B.C.

Research and work

Smith's research made important contributions to the development of reading theory. His book Understanding Reading: A Psycholinguistic Analysis of Reading and Learning to Read is regarded as a fundamental text in the development of the now discredited whole language movement. Amongst others, Smith's research and writings in psycholinguistics inspired cognitive psychologists Keith Stanovich and Richard West's research into the role of context in reading.

Smith's work, in particular Understanding Reading: A Psycholinguistic Analysis of Reading and Learning to Read, is a synthesis of psycholinguistic and cognitive psychology research applied to reading. Working from diverse perspectives, Frank Smith and Kenneth S. Goodman developed the theory of a unified single reading process that comprises an interaction between reader, text and language. On the whole, Smith's writing challenges conventional teaching and diverts from popular assumptions about reading.

Apart from his research in language, his research interests included the psychological, social and cultural consequences of human technology.

Ideas
Smith advocated the concept that "children learn to read by reading". In 1975 he participated in a television documentary filmed by Stephen Rose for the BBC Horizon TV series while based at the Toronto Institute for Studies in Education. The programme focused on his work with a single -year-old child called Matthew.

He was against the 1970s idea that children should first learn the letters and letter combinations that convey the English language's forty-four sounds (Clymer's 45 phonic generalizations) and then they can read whole words by decoding them from their component phonemes. This "sounding out" words is a phonics, rather than a whole language, technique which is rooted in intellectual independence. The whole-language theory explained reading as a "language experience," where the reader interacts with the text/content and this in turn facilitates the link - "knowledge" - between the text and meaning. The emphasis is on the process or comprehension of the text.

Books

Co-authored books

Essays

Articles

Co-authored articles

References

20th-century educational theorists
American educational theorists
Psycholinguists
Harvard University alumni
University of Western Australia alumni
People from Vancouver Island
1928 births

2020 deaths